Munif is an Arabic  and Bengali male given name, which means "exalted". Munif may refer to:

Abdel Rahman Munif (1933–2004), Saudi Arabian novelist
Djelal Munif Bey (died 1919), Turkish diplomat
Munif al-Razzaz (1919–1984), Syrian politician
Munif Mohammed Abou Rish (died 1974), Palestinian journalist
Munif, a citizen of Sollentuna

Ras Munif, a town in Jordan

See also 

Manaf (disambiguation)
Munaf (disambiguation)

Arabic masculine given names